The Catawba Trail is a trail developed and used by Native Americans that leads from the Carolinas northerly into Ohio, Indiana and Pennsylvania.  Its several branches led from western Virginia, through West Virginia, Kentucky, and eastern Tennessee.  It is a part of the Great Indian Warpath. Its South Carolina and North Carolina origination passes through the Unaka Mountains and the Allegheny Mountains.

This south and northerly wilderness way was used by the ancient Native Americans of the regions for trade exchange and raiding at various times and by various cultures from antiquity. The Catawba Trail of the Cumberland Mountains and Ouasioto Mountains in south western West Virginia intersects the Appalachian Trail. A major trail that it crossed has been developed into the Appalachian Trail, today.

References
 

Native American trails in the United States
Historic trails and roads in the United States
Native American history of Ohio
Native American history of Indiana
Native American history of Pennsylvania
Native American history of Virginia
Native American history of West Virginia
Native American history of Kentucky
Native American history of Tennessee
Native American history of South Carolina
Native American history of North Carolina